Immanuel Lutheran College may refer to:

 Immanuel Lutheran College (Hong Kong), a secondary school in Hong Kong
Immanuel Lutheran College (North Carolina), a former a high school, college, and seminary in Greensboro, North Carolina
 Immanuel Lutheran College (Eau Claire), a high school, college, and seminary in Eau Claire, Wisconsin
Immanuel Lutheran College, Buderim, a primary and secondary college run by the Lutheran Church of Australia

See also
 Immanuel College (disambiguation)